Andolan may refer to:

 Andolan (music), in Hindustani music,  a gentle oscillation around a note
 Andolan (1995 film), a 1995 Bollywood film directed by Aziz Sejawal
 Andolan (1975 film)
 Andolan (1951 film)